Godfrey Howitt (8 October 1800 – 4 December 1873), entomologist, was born in Heanor in Derbyshire to Thomas Howitt. Thomas had farmed a few acres of land at Heanor and joined the Society of Friends on his marriage with Phoebe Tantum, a member of the same society, with whom he acquired a considerable fortune.

Godfrey was educated at Mansfield and tutored by his brother William before graduating from Edinburgh University Medical School with an MD in 1830. He married Phoebe Bakewell the following year, on 6 April 1831, at the Friends' Meeting House in Castle Donington. He practised medicine in Leicester and in Nottingham was honorary physician at both the City Infirmary and the General Hospital.

Life in Australia
In 1839, he migrated to improve the health of his eldest child, John Henry. Howitt and his family, a nephew and his wife's brothers, arriving at Port Phillip on the Lord Goderich in April 1840. Howitt erected a prefabricated wooden house he had brought with him and shortly after arriving began work at the Melbourne Hospital.

In 1842 Godfrey and his wife lost their youngest son, baby Charles, whose death was recorded in the letter of the eldest child, John Henry to his cousin Alfred, still in England at the time. John Henry, whose health had always been precarious, survived his youngest sibling by less than a year and in 1843 he also died.

Howitt continued to work and by 1845 he had extensive lands which covered a number of streets, a large garden, fields near Yea and a farm in Caulfield. The current Howitt Road in North Caulfield runs through his former lands. 

Howitt was made president and honorary physician of the Melbourne Benevolent Asylum in 1847. In June 1852, he was visited by his brother William and his sons Alfred William Howitt and Charlton Howitt accompanied by the Pre-Raphaelite Edward La Trobe Bateman. In the October he also played host to two other Pre-Raphaelites, Thomas Woolner and Bernard Smith, before they set out to the gold-rush diggings.

Woolner and Smith stayed in Australia for a number of years, eventually returning to England whilst Edward and Alfred stayed. Alfred became a significant figure in the developing colony through his contributions to literature, administration and exploration, whilst Edward applied himself to landscape design.

From 1853 to 1871 Godfrey was a member of the University of Melbourne's council and on the Medical School Committee. He was a founder of the University of Melbourne Medical School in 1858. He was also the first vice-president of the Philosophical Society of Victoria in 1854, Treasurer and Vice President of the Philosophical Institute of Victoria in 1855 and 1856 respectively and a founding member of the Royal Society of Victoria, its successor from 1859 to 1868.

Botany and entomology
In Victoria, Ferdinand von Mueller named the monotypic genus Howittia, an Australian blue-flowered mallow he had found in 1855 after Godfrey, "in acknowledgement of his devotion to botany".
He helped to found the Entomological Society of London, was a member of the Botanical Society of Edinburgh and in 1839 published The Nottinghamshire Flora.

When he died on 4 December 1873 in Caulfield he was survived by three sons and a daughter. To the University of Melbourne he left one thousand pounds for scholarships, books on botany and his entomological collection.

References

19th-century English medical doctors
People from Heanor
1800 births
1873 deaths
Botanists active in Australia
Alumni of the University of Edinburgh
University of Melbourne people
English emigrants to colonial Australia
Settlers of Melbourne
19th-century Australian medical doctors